Jule Niemeier was the defending champion but chose not to participate.

Maja Chwalińska won the title, defeating Ekaterine Gorgodze in the final, 7–5, 6–3.

Seeds

Draw

Finals

Top half

Bottom half

References

External links
Main Draw

I.ČLTK Prague Open - Singles
I.ČLTK Prague Open